Ferenc Jesina (19 August 1887 – 27 November 1951) was a Slovak track and field athlete who competed for Hungary in the 1908 Summer Olympics. He was born in Trnava. In 1908 he participated in the discus throw competition as well as in the freestyle javelin throw event but in both competitions his final ranking is unknown.

References

External links
 
Sports Reference
profile 

1887 births
1951 deaths
Sportspeople from Trnava
Hungarian male discus throwers
Hungarian male javelin throwers
Olympic athletes of Hungary
Athletes (track and field) at the 1908 Summer Olympics
Slovak male discus throwers
Slovak male javelin throwers